The Stone Arch Bridge is a former railroad bridge crossing the Mississippi River at Saint Anthony Falls in downtown Minneapolis, Minnesota. It is the only arched bridge made of stone on the entire Mississippi River. It is the second oldest bridge on the river next to Eads Bridge.  The bridge was built to connect the railway system to the new Union Depot, which at that time was planned to be built between Hennepin Avenue and Nicollet Avenue. The bridge was completed in 1883, costing $650,000 at the time ($ today). 117 Portland Avenue is the general address of the historic complex.

Located between the 3rd Avenue Bridge and the I-35W Saint Anthony Falls Bridge, the Stone Arch Bridge was built in 1883 by railroad tycoon James J. Hill for his Great Northern Railway, and accessed the former passenger station located about a mile to the west, on the west bank of the river. 
For a time, the bridge was dubbed "Hill's Folly" until the value of Hill's new bridge as a passenger rail link became evident.

The structure is now used as a pedestrian and bicycle bridge. It was added to the National Register of Historic Places in 1971 as a part of the Saint Anthony Falls Historic District, (District #71000438). The bridge was designated as a National Historic Civil Engineering Landmark in 1974.

History
In 1880, Minneapolis was a bustling city with major commerce mostly located on the west bank of the Mississippi River, while smaller, up-and-coming businesses were on the east. With the merging of the Village of St. Anthony on the east side, Minneapolis continuously grew in population, and the Hennepin Avenue suspension bridge served as the sole thoroughfare for commuters and pedestrians. At that time, the Hennepin Avenue bridge was overused and in desperate need of upkeep. The city's network of railroads, which was crucial for urbanization, was also located on the east side of the river. With the rapid increase in commercialization, Minneapolis businessmen sought a plan to accommodate the heavy flow of traffic, and immediately considered the railroad mogul James J. Hill for the task. The idea was to build a railroad depot, similar to the St. Paul Union Depot, along the intersections of Hennepin Avenue and Nicollet Avenue in downtown Minneapolis, which would also connect to the Manitoba Road tracks, eventually developing into the Great Northern Railway.

The initial planning was conducted during a meeting held near the end of 1881. The project would include building a terminal in downtown Minneapolis and connecting the rails to the Manitoba Railway, the execution for which was accomplished by the Minneapolis Union Railway company, a team that was built for the sole purpose of overseeing the project. The stockholders met for the first time immediately the following year and Col. Charles C. Smith was selected as the head engineer.

The bridge has been altered somewhat from its original appearance. When the Upper Lock and Dam were built at Saint Anthony Falls, two of the arches were replaced with a moveable truss so barges could pass through the lock. Later, in 1965, flood waters undermined three of the piers and caused the bridge to sag fourteen inches.  The bridge was repaired by strengthening the piers and reinforcing underneath two of the arches.

When it was in rail service, the bridge carried trains of many railroads to and from the Minneapolis Great Northern Depot, including the Great Northern Railway's Empire Builder. The bridge ceased to be used as a railroad bridge in 1978, and after a period of disuse, was repaired and adapted in the early 1990s to its present use. The bike and walking trails across the bridge are integrated into the city's park and trail system, and form part of the St Anthony Falls Heritage Trail, which includes interpretive plaques describing the history of the area. The most recent renovations—including indirect lighting—were completed in late 2005. The lighting was paid for by private donations.

During the summer months, the Stone Arch Bridge is a focus of numerous festivals in the area of St. Anthony Main and Historic Main Street. The Stone Arch Festival of the Arts occurs Father's Day weekend and features many local artists. Fireworks displays on the Fourth of July and during the Minneapolis Aquatennial in late July also bring crowds; fireworks are launched from nearby Hennepin Island. The bridge offers views of the Minneapolis skyline, Pillsbury "A" Mill, the Mill City Museum, and many other places in the district, and is near both the restaurants of Main St SE and the Guthrie Theater.

Timeline
The Minnesota Historical Society and the Great Northern Railway provided the following important historical timeline:
 
1881 - James J. Hill commissioned the Stone Arch Bridge project 

1882 - The initial stockholders meeting was held and Col. Charles C. Smith was assigned as the construction's head engineer

1883 - After 22 months of intensive work, the Stone Arch Bridge was completed 

1885 - The Union Depot at the heart of Minneapolis was completed and substantially increased the passenger volume

1907-1911 - Renovations were done to improve the bridge's drainage system and strengthen its structural support in order to transport heavier loads

1925 - Another renovation conducted to increase the width to allow bigger trains that would house more passengers

1961- 1963 - The lock and dam was built at St. Anthony falls which required arch number 13 and 14 to be replaced with a 200-foot Warren truss and allow barges to pass 

1965 - The bridge underwent renovation when the Mississippi River flooded, causing the seventh pier to sink about 14 inches

1971 - The bridge became part of the National Register of Historic Places 

1978 - The last passenger train crossed the Stone Arch Bridge 

1989 - The bridge was bought by the Hennepin County Regional Railroad Authority 

1992 - The ownership was transferred to Minnesota Department of Transportation 

1994 - The bridge was converted into a biking/walking path by the Minneapolis Park Board

Design and construction

The Stone Arch Bridge, commissioned by James J Hill and designed by Charles C Smith, was built between 1882 and 1883. Hill originally intended to build an iron bridge spanning the Mississippi at Nicollet Island, but Smith discovered that pursuing that design would be detrimental to St Anthony Falls’ eroding sandstone. Smith's design was pioneering and the signature arches were designed to account for the falls and the surrounding topography. The stone used to make the bridge was locally sourced, including granite from Sauk Rapids for the piers and magnesium limestone from Mankato and Iowa for the upper portion.

In the 130 years of its existence the bridge has undergone a number of upgrades and repairs. In 1925 the width of the bridge was increased to allow for larger railcars. Then in 1994 the bridge was converted to a pedestrian walkway.

Heritage trail plaque
A plaque near the bridge explains that the bridge was built for the Manitoba Line (St. Paul, Minneapolis and Manitoba Railway), which would be used to bring wheat from the Red River valley and Canada to the Minneapolis mills. It remains as a monument to James J. Hill, his vision, and is a National Historic Civil Engineering Landmark.

See also
List of crossings of the Upper Mississippi River
List of shared-use paths in Minneapolis

References

 Olsen, Byron D. (1998). Great Northern Railway 1945-1970 Photo Archive Volume 2.

Image gallery: the Stone Arch Bridge

External links
 
Stone Arch Bridge, National Park Service
  
Photograph
Stone Arch Festival of the Arts
Minneapolis-riverfront.com The city's official promotional site for the riverfront district.
Interactive 360 Degree Virtual Tour featuring the Stone Arch Bridge
VIDEO: Hill's Folly: James J Hill and the Stone Arch Bridge

Bridges completed in 1883
Bridges in Minneapolis
Railroad bridges on the National Register of Historic Places in Minnesota
Bridges over the Mississippi River
Cyclist bridges in the United States
Former railway bridges in the United States
Great Northern Railway (U.S.) bridges
Historic Civil Engineering Landmarks
Mississippi Gorge
Mississippi National River and Recreation Area
National Register of Historic Places in Minneapolis
Pedestrian bridges in Minnesota
Railroad bridges in Minnesota
Viaducts in the United States
Historic district contributing properties in Minnesota
Stone arch bridges in the United States
1883 establishments in Minnesota
Shared-use paths in Minneapolis